Finn Thomsen (born 16 February 1955 Arhus, Denmark) is a former motorcycle speedway rider

Career
Thomsen first rode in the UK with the Wolverhampton Wolves. Signed by Len Silver for the Hackney Hawks in a swap deal with Dave Morton, becoming team captain in 1980 . When the Hawks closed at the end of the season 1983 he then retired  from British speedway and then to Spain in 1989. He rode for Swindon Robins in 1986.

He was a Speedway World Team Cup winner with the Danish speedway team in 1978, 1981 and in 1983.

World Final Appearances

Individual World Championship
 1977 -  Göteborg, Ullevi - 5th - 10pts
 1979 -  Chorzów, Silesian Stadium - 10th - 6pts
 1980 -  Göteborg, Ullevi - 10th - 7pts

World Pairs Championship
 1976 -  Eskilstuna, Eskilstuna Motorstadion (with Ole Olsen) - 2nd - 24pts (8)
 1978 -  Chorzów, Silesian Stadium (with Ole Olsen) - 3rd - 21pts (5)

World Team Cup
 1978 -  Landshut, Stadion Ellermühle (with Ole Olsen / Mike Lohmann / Hans Nielsen) - Winner - 37pts (7)
 1979 -  London, White City Stadium (with Ole Olsen / Hans Nielsen / Mike Lohmann / Bo Petersen) - 2nd - 31pts (4)
 1981 -  Olching, Olching Speedwaybahn (with Ole Olsen / Hans Nielsen / Erik Gundersen / Tommy Knudsen) - Winner - 36pts (1)
 1983 -  Vojens, Speedway Center (with Ole Olsen / Hans Nielsen / Erik Gundersen / Peter Ravn) - Winner - 35pts (0)

References

External links 
Hackney Hawks Website

1955 births
Living people
Danish speedway riders
Hackney Hawks riders
Wolverhampton Wolves riders